Paddock Mall is an enclosed shopping mall in Ocala, Florida. Opened in 1980, the anchor stores are JCPenney, Macy's, and Belk. There is 1 vacant anchor store, formerly occupied by Sears.

History
The first plan for Paddock Mall was made in 1973 by local developers, who sold the land to  Edward J. DeBartolo Corporation. DeBartolo and Arlen Realty and Development Corporation opened Paddock Mall in 1980. Original anchors included Maas Brothers, Belk-Lindsey, and JCPenney.

A 1991 expansion added Sears as a fourth anchor; the same year, the Maas Brothers store was absorbed into Burdines. In 1997, a food court was added on the south end. Burdines became Burdines-Macy's in 2003 and then just Macy's in 2005.

2010s

Washington Prime Group, based in Columbus, Ohio acquired the mall along with Boynton Beach Mall, Edison Mall, Seminole Towne Center, and Melbourne Square as part of its merger with Glimcher Properties in 2014.

In 2015, Sears Holdings spun off 235 of its properties, including the Sears at Paddock Mall, into Seritage Growth Properties.

On October 15, 2018, it was announced that Sears would be closing as part of a plan to close 142 stores nationwide.

2020s

On October 5, 2022, it was announced that the former Sears store would be redeveloped into a mixed-use development.

References

Buildings and structures in Ocala, Florida
Tourist attractions in Marion County, Florida
Washington Prime Group
Shopping malls in Florida
Shopping malls established in 1980